The following is a list of the squads which competed in the 1992 Toulon Tournament

Players in boldface have been capped at full international level at some point in their career.

Group A

France 
Coach:  Marc Bourrier

England 
Coach:  Dave Sexton

Mexico
Coach:  Vicente Cayetano Rodriguez

Czechoslovakia
Coach:  Ivan Kopecky

Group B

Scotland
Coach:  Craig Brown

United States
Coach:  Lothar Osiander

FR Yugoslavia 
Coach:  Milan Nikolic

Portugal 
Coach:  Jesualdo Ferreira

(N°17) a (N°23)

References

 1992 edition at Toulon Tournament official website

Squads
Toulon Tournament squads